Jean-Yves Moyart, sometimes known as Maître Mô (21 October 1967 – 20 February 2021) was a French criminal lawyer and blogger.

Biography
Moyart's parents were literature teachers in Lille, where he was born on 21 October 1967. In 1992, he earned a master's degree in law theory and judicial science from Lille 2 University of Health and Law. That same year, he became a member of the Lille Bar. He worked as a criminal defense lawyer in the office of Philippe Simoneau and Christian Delbé before opening his own practice in 1994 alongside Jérôme Pianezza. According to La Voix du Nord, he was "responsible for the criminal law training module within the Convention Nationale des Avocats de Lille".

That same year, many of his texts were published by Éditions de la Table ronde under the title Au guet-apens : chroniques de la justice pénale ordinaire. Another edition was published in 2013. In 2015, he announced that half his activities concerned cases of people benefiting from legal aid. He also defended Denis Waxin.

Jean-Yves Moyart died on 20 February 2021 at the age of 53.

Works
Au guet-apens : chroniques de la justice pénale ordinaire (2011)

References

1967 births
2021 deaths
Lawyers from Lille
French bloggers
Place of death missing
20th-century French lawyers
21st-century French lawyers